Xanthorhoe alticolata is a species of moth in the family Geometridae first described by William Barnes and James Halliday McDunnough in 1916. It is found in North America.

The MONA or Hodges number for Xanthorhoe alticolata is 7385.

References

Further reading

External links

 

Xanthorhoe
Moths described in 1916